The 2004 Leeds City Council election took place on 10 June 2004 to elect members of City of Leeds Metropolitan Borough Council in England.

Following a full boundary review of Leeds' electoral wards by the Boundary Committee for England, all of the council's 99 seats were contested on the new ward boundaries. The previous all-out election in Leeds was in 1980.

The election saw the previously Labour-run council falling into no overall control. The Liberal Democrats and Conservatives agreed to take control of the council in a formal coalition, the first non-Labour administration in 24 years since 1980.

Election result

This result had the following consequences for the total number of seats on the council after the elections:

Ward results

By-elections between 2004 and 2006

References

2004 English local elections
2004
2000s in Leeds